Charles Darwin University (CDU) is an Australian public university with a main campus in Darwin and eight satellite campuses in some metropolitan and regional areas. It was established in 2003 after the merger of Northern Territory University, the Menzies School of Health Research, and Centralian College.

CDU is a member of the group of seven Innovative Research Universities in Australia, and offers academic degrees as well as vocational education.

History
Charles Darwin University has evolved over the years through the merging of several higher education institutions.

Darwin Community College
Darwin Community College, founded in 1974 and renamed Darwin Institute of Technology in 1984, was a combined College of Advanced Education and a TAFE College. It was situated on what is now the Casuarina Campus, although it used other buildings at various times in Darwin. By the time of the formation of the Northern Territory University, it gave degrees in arts, education, business and applied science.

Menzies School of Health Research
The Menzies School of Health Research was established in 1985 as a body corporate of the Northern Territory Government under the Menzies School of Health Research Act 1985. This act was amended in 2004 to formalise the relationship with Charles Darwin University. Menzies is now a major partner of CDU and constitutes a school within the university on campus at CDU Casuarina offering post-graduate degrees and higher degrees by research.

University College of the Northern Territory
On several occasions the Government of the Northern Territory requested the Australian Commonwealth Government to finance a university in the territory. The response was always that the population was too small. In 1985, it took the unusual step of financing the University College of the Northern Territory itself for a five-year period from 1987 to 1991. The college was governed by a council, chaired by Austin Asche and led by a warden, Professor Jim Thomson, from the University of Queensland. An arrangement was made with the University of Queensland that the college would award degrees from that institution. Staff were recruited in 1986 and housed in the old Darwin Primary School buildings. Just prior to taking the first students in February 1987, the college moved to converted building of the former Darwin Hospital at Myilly Point in Darwin. The former nurses' hostel became a student residence, named International House. The college had two faculties, of arts and science. It awarded, through the University of Queensland link, the first Doctor of Philosophy degrees in the Northern Territory.

Centralian College
Centralian College was founded in 1993 from the merger of Sadadeen Senior Secondary College and the Alice Springs College of TAFE. During its life, the college delivered senior secondary, TAFE and higher education through its main campus in Alice Springs, and to a lesser extent the whole Northern Territory.

Centralian College is a co-educational senior secondary school, for students from Year 10 to Year 12, and shares its campus with the Charles Darwin University campus of Alice Springs. Centralian College uses the university's facilities and students attending Centralian College can participate in VET courses (as early as Year 10) offered by CDU.

Northern Territory University
The Northern Territory University was founded in January 1989 by a merger of the Darwin Institute of Technology and the University College of the Northern Territory. The merger was controversial, but forced by the so-called Dawkins Revolution under federal Minister of Education John Dawkins. The new university started life on 1 January 1989. Degrees of the University of Queensland continued to be awarded to students who initially enrolled in them.

The first vice-chancellor was Professor Malcolm Nairn from Murdoch University in Western Australia. Under his leadership the university prospered and morale was high among both staff and students. However funding declined as student numbers rose. During his term of office the various study centres on the territory, that previously had been run directly by the NT Government, became part of the university. The Palmerston campus, for a few years previously a TAFE College, also became part of the university. The Palmerston campus is situated on University Avenue, as this was the proposed site for a new university in a submission to the federal government in 1981.

The second vice-chancellor was Professor Roger Holmes  from Griffith University. After an initial excellent start to his period of office, he disappointed the university and local community by resigning after serving for only one semester to take up the post of vice-chancellor at University of Newcastle.

He was replaced as third vice-chancellor by the then deputy vice-chancellor, Professor Ron McKay. Under his leadership, the financial constraints on the university increased. The environment of having to provide as wide as possible a tertiary education to a small population living in a very large area far from alternative institutions became even more hostile and the university did not prosper. In January 2001, the Katherine Rural College, including Mataranka Station, became part of the university.

After McKay's resignation due to ill health in 2002, an interim vice-chancellor, Professor Ken McKinnon, former vice-chancellor of the University of Wollongong was appointed. He took various actions to improve the health of the university, some controversial, such as the proposal to merge with Centralian College with a new name for the university.

Charles Darwin University

On 21 August 2003, the Northern Territory Legislative Assembly passed the Charles Darwin University Act 2003 (NT), merging Alice Springs' Centralian College and the Menzies School of Health Research with the Northern Territory University to form Charles Darwin University from 1 January 2004. The inaugural university council meeting was held on 26 November 2003.

Organisation

Charles Darwin University is a dual-sector university, which means the university offers vocational education and training (aka VET) courses and higher education undergraduate and postgraduate degrees, covering a wide range of subjects and disciplines.

CDU is a member of the group of seven Innovative Research Universities in Australia, It has close links with Flinders University in South Australia, which itself has many students from the Northern Territory, including joint management of the Centre for Remote Health in Alice Springs and the Northern Territory Medical Program which is located on campus at Casuarina CDU.

According to the 2019 Annual Report, enrolments in 2019 totalled 20,6491 students, with 14,847 students enrolled in vocational and educational training courses and 12,343 enrolled in higher education degrees.

Colleges
CDU is made up of six Colleges:
 Asia Pacific College of Business and Law
 College of Education
 College of Engineering, IT and Environment
 College of Health & Human Sciences
 College of Indigenous Futures, Arts & Society
College of Nursing & Midwifery

Vocational Education and Training is embedded within the Colleges.

Campuses
The university has its main campus in Darwin, with eight satellite campuses in some metropolitan and regional areas.

Research institutes and centres
The university's research institutes and centres include:
North Australian Centre for Oil and Gas 
Menzies School of Health Research (see also above)
The Northern Institute
Research Institute for Environment & Livelihoods
Australian Centre for Indigenous Knowledge and Education (ACIKE)
Research Centre for Health and Wellbeing
Centre for Renewable Energy
Centre for School Leadership, Learning & Development
International Centre for Education (IGCE)

Academic profile

Rankings

According to Times Higher Education (THE) World University Rankings of 2021, Charles Darwin University is ranked 501-600th in the world and 29th in Australia. It is also ranked 101-150th in the world in the 2020 Times Higher Education 100 Under 50, making it the youngest university in Australia to make this list.

In the 2019 Student Experience Survey, Charles Darwin University recorded an overall satisfaction rating of 75.2.

Student associations
Students are represented by the CDU Student Council (CDUSC), and postgraduate students by the CDU Postgraduate Student Association, a member of the Council of Australian Postgraduate Associations. Multiple student associations also exist for the individual schools, including the CDU Law Students' Society, associated with the Australian Law Students' Association, and the CDU Business Students' Association. These student groups offer academic, career and professional support to their members, as well as organizing social events throughout the year.

Vincent Lingiari Memorial Lecture

The Vincent Lingiari Memorial Lectures were established in 1996 to commemorate the Wave Hill walk-off, which was led by Gurindji man Vincent Lingiari in August 1966. Held annually at the Casuarina campus amphitheatre, and open to the public, the lecture now forms part of the Gurindji Freedom Day Festival events. Past lectures have been given by William Deane, Gough Whitlam, Galarrwuy Yunupingu, Patrick Dodson, Malcolm Fraser, and Marcia Langton.

Owing to the COVID-19 pandemic in Australia, the 2020 lecture was jointly presented in an online format by Pat Dodson, Marcia Langton and Bruce Pascoe.

In 2022, Torres Strait Islander man Thomas Mayor, advocate for the Uluru Statement from the Heart and  the proposed Indigenous Voice to Parliament, delivered the oration. He drew parallels between Lingiari's struggle to be heard by governments to what Indigenous peoples of Australia are experiencing today.

Territory FM
104.1 Territory FM is a community radio station owned by CDU and based at the Casuarina campus. The station is broadcast on 104.1 Darwin and Palmerston and 98.7 Alice Springs and can also be heard in Batchelor, Katherine / Tindal, Tennant Creek, Nhulunbuy and Adelaide River.

Notable people

The current and fourth chancellor of the university is the Honourable Paul Henderson, inducted March 2019. The vice-chancellor and president of the university since May 2021 is Professor Scott Bowman.

See also
 List of universities in Australia

References

External links

 

Charles Darwin University
Australian vocational education and training providers
Universities in the Northern Territory
2003 establishments in Australia
Educational institutions established in 2003